Air Chief Marshal Norman Anil Kumar Browne, PVSM, AVSM, VM, ADC also known as "Charlie" Browne, is a former Chief of the Air Staff (CAS) of the Indian Air Force. He served in this position from 31 July 2011 to 31 Dec 2013. Browne served as India's Ambassador to Norway from August 2014 to April 2016.

Personal life 
Browne was brought up in Allahabad and did his schooling from St. Joseph's College, Allahabad. He is married to Mrs. Kiran Browne. Together, they have a son, Omar, who serves as a fighter pilot in the IAF; and a daughter, Alisha, who is working with a multinational company.

Military career
Browne is an alumnus of the National Defence Academy and also trained with the United Kingdom's Royal Air Force on Jaguar aircraft before commanding a Jaguar Squadron. A graduate of Air Command and Staff College, Maxwell Air Force Base, USA, he has held many appointments including Joint Director at Air War Strategy Cell at Air Headquarters, Chief Operations Officer and Air Officer Commanding of a Sukhoi Su-30 base, Air-I at Western Air Command and Assistant Chief of Air Staff (Intelligence) at Air Headquarters. Browne was commissioned into the fighter stream of the IAF on 24 June 1972.

As a fighter pilot, he has logged over 3,100 hours flying Hunters, Jaguars, MiG 21s and Su-30MKIs, and has served as an instructor at the Tactics and Combat Development Establishment (TACDE) and Defence Services Staff College (DSSC), Wellington.

Air Chief Marshal Browne became Vice Chief of the Air Staff until 31 July 2011, when he replaced outgoing Air Chief Marshal Pradeep Vasant Naik. Prior to taking over as the Vice Chief of the Air Staff in January 2011, he served as the AOC-in-C of Western Air Command. Upon the retirement of Admiral Nirmal Kumar Verma, Browne became the new Chairman of the Chiefs of Staff Committee. Browne was later replaced by Air Chief Marshal Arup Raha.

Awards

Diplomatic career
Browne served as India's Ambassador to Norway from 30 August 2014 to April 2016.

References 

1951 births
Living people
Anglo-Indian people
Ambassadors of India to Norway
Chiefs of Air Staff (India)
Vice Chiefs of Air Staff (India)
Indian Air Force officers
Indian aviators
Recipients of the Param Vishisht Seva Medal
Recipients of the Ati Vishisht Seva Medal
Indian air attachés
Academic staff of the Defence Services Staff College
Air Command and Staff College alumni